Sreekandamangalam ("The City of Shiva") is a hamlet which belongs to the township of Athirampuzha and is located in the Kottayam district, Kerala, India.

References

Villages in Kottayam district